Islam is Brunei's official religion, 82.70 percent of the population is Muslim, mostly Sunnis of Malay origin who follow the Syafi'e school of thought. Most of the other Muslim groups are Malay Kedayans (converts from indigenous tribal groups), local Chinese and Dayak Iban converts.

History
Islam was adopted in the 15th century when a Muslim-Malay was installed as Sultan. The Sultan traditionally was responsible for upholding Islamic traditions, although the responsibility was usually delegated to appointed officials.

Since the 1930s Sultans have used rising oil revenues to provide an extensive social welfare system and promote Islam, including subsidising the Haji, building Masjids, and expanding the Department of Religious Affairs (KHEU).

The Islamic religious education in Brunei is well organized and structured. In 1956, on the personal request of Sultan of Brunei Sultan Haji Omar Ali Saifuddien, the government of Johore sent a Senior Islamic Religious Officer, Tuan Guru Haji Othman Haji Said to Brunei to assist the government of Brunei in establishing a similar Government Islamic Religious School as in Johore. He successfully organized and established the Brunei Government Islamic Religious School throughout all districts in Brunei [1956 -1962).

The 1st School was established in 1956 at Sekolah Sultan Muhammad Jamalul Alam [SMJA} in Brunei Town. The school adopted the same syllabus [ from Standard 1 to Standard 6 ] and used the same books as that of Johore Government Islamic School, running in the afternoon at the same school premises as Brunei Government National schools.  After completing Standard 6, the students may choose to undergo a special training class for a year to be trained as a qualified Islamic Religious School. Initially, Islamic teachers from Johore were brought in. 

The Royal family of Brunei is well-educated in Islam. Similar Islamic education was introduced to all the Royal Families of Sultan Omar Ali Saifuddien, [including the present Sultan Haji Hasaanal Bolkiah and his wife Raja Isteri Hajjah Saleha]. Special School for the Royal Family was established in 1957 at Istana Darul Hana and the first Islamic Religious teacher was Cikgu Hajjah Salbiah Haji Shafii [ The wife of Tuan Guru Haji Othman Haji Said]. 

With the constitution in 1959, Islam became the official religion of the country.

On 30 April 2014, Sultan Hassanal Bolkiah announced the implementation and enforcement of the first phase of Syariah Penal Code Law in Brunei starting 1 May 2014.

Conversions to Islam 
The number of Bruneian converts to Islam has increased ever since Islam became the official religion of the country in 1954. And by 2004, it was recorded that over 16,000 Bruneians had converted to Islam. From 2009-2020, there have been 5,884 individuals who have converted to Islam in Brunei.

See also
 Malay Islamic identity
 List of mosques in Brunei

References